The 2023 ISU World Team Trophy is an international figure skating competition that will be held from April 13–16, 2023 in Tokyo, Japan. The top six International Skating Union members were invited to compete in a team format with points awarded based on skaters' placement. Participating countries selected two men's single skaters, two women' single skaters, one pair, and one ice dance entry for their team.

Scoring 
Skaters will compete in both the short program/rhythm dance and the free skating/free dance segments for their team. Each segment was scored separately. The points earned per placement are as follows:

Tie-breaking within a segment:
 If two or more skaters, pairs, or ice dance couples have the same rank in the short program or rhythm dance, then the total technical score will be used to break ties.
 If two or more skaters, pairs, or ice dance couples have the same rank in the free skating or free dance, then the total components score will be used to break ties.
If these results do not break the tie, the competitors concerned will be considered tied. The team points will be awarded according to the placement of the skaters/couples in each discipline.

Tie-breaking within team standings:
 The highest total team points from the two best places in different disciplines of the current phase will break the ties.
 If they remain tied, the highest total segment scores of the two best places according to the team points in different disciplines of the current phase will break the ties.
 If they remain tied, the highest total team points from the three best places in different disciplines of the current phase will break the ties.
 If they remain tied, the highest total segment scores of the three best places according to the team points in different disciplines of the current phase will break the ties.
If these criteria fail to break the ties, the teams will be considered as tied.

Qualification 

For a team to be qualified it must obtain points in at least three of the four disciplines. This chart only include top twelve teams able to achieve so.
The points denoted with an asterisk (*) would be valid only if the skater/couple who earned the points could not obtain points in the 2023 World Championships.
In spite of the fact that the qualified team can only participate with two single skaters each women and men, one pair and one ice dance couple, for the qualification the highest points per discipline will be used. This means that more and different skaters/couples per ISU Member may contribute to the total qualification points. Practically, two to four different men's single skaters, two to four different women's single skaters, one to two pairs and one to two ice dance couples could contribute to the total points.

Entries 
Names with an asterisk (*) denote the team captain.

Teams will begin announcing their entries after the 2023 World Championships.

Medalists

Results

Team standings

Men

Women

Pairs

Ice dance

References 

World Team Trophy
ISU World Team Trophy